Khosrow-Yazdegerd was a 5th-century statesman in Sasanian Iran, who was active during the reign of shah Yazdegerd I (r. 399-421). He first appears in 410, when he was sent with Mihr-Shapur as the shah's representative to the Nestorian Council of Seleucia-Ctesiphon. Khosrow-Yazdegerd is the second person known to occupy the office of wuzurg framadar (grand vizier) after Abarsam, who was active under Ardashir I (r. 224-242). He was most likely succeeded by Mihr Narseh.

Sources 
 
 

5th-century Iranian people
4th-century births
5th-century deaths
Viziers of the Sasanian Empire